Cormet de Roselend (el. 1967 m.) is a high mountain pass in the Alps in the department of Savoie in France.

It connects Beaufort in the Beaufortain valley and Bourg-Saint-Maurice in the Tarentaise Valley. On the west side of the pass lies the Lac de Roselend, a reservoir that can be reached by the Col de Méraillet or the Col du Pré.

Details of climb

On the north-western side, starting from Beaufort, the climb is 20.3 km long. Over this distance, the climb is 1227 m. (an average percentage of 6.0%), with the steepest sections at 10.0%.

From Bourg-Saint-Maurice to the south-east, the Cormet de Roselend is 19.35 km long. Over this distance, the climb is 1154 m. (an average percentage of 6.0%), with the steepest sections at 8.9%.

Appearances in Tour de France
The pass was first included in the Tour de France in 1979 and has since featured 13 times, most recently in stage 9 of the 2021 Tour de France.

One of the most memorable years for the Cormet de Roselend was the 1996 Tour de France. It was just before the summit on the Cormet de Roselend that Frenchman Stéphane Heulot cracked, lost the Maillot Jaune and bowed out of the race.  It was also on the Cormet de Roselend that Johan Bruyneel overshot a fast left-hand bend and disappeared over the edge, as he descended towards Bourg-St-Maurice. Spectators feared the worst but thankfully Bruyneel managed to climb back up, apparently unscathed.

See also
 List of highest paved roads in Europe
 List of mountain passes

References

External links
Profile on climbbybike.com
Climb profiles (French)

Mountain passes of Auvergne-Rhône-Alpes
Mountain passes of the Alps